Zhang Jingyao (1881–1933), was a Chinese general, the military governor of Chahar and later Hunan Province. He was known as one of the most notorious of China's warlords, known for his troops' atrocities and the looting of Hunan of its wealth during his administration. He was removed from office for his abuses and assassinated in 1933 for aiding the Empire of Japan by attempting to set up the monarchy of Puyi in northern China with Japanese money.

Born in 1881, he eventually joined the Beiyang Army, rising to the rank of general, and then was part of the Anhui clique. He was Military Governor of Chahar Province from October 18, 1917, to March 29, 1918. He was then given the post of Military Governor of Hunan province from March 1918. While he was governor his troops committed many atrocities, including killing civilians, robbing the wealthy and rape. He was also accused of reducing the province to a state of beggary.

In August 1919, he censored Mao Zedong's "Xiang-jiang River Commentary" magazine because of Mao's efforts to organize a movement to expel him from the governorship. Mao led a Hunan students' delegation to Peking, where he appealed nationwide for support and revealed Zhang Jingyao's atrocities in Hunan Province.

At Yochow on June 16, 1920, Zhang's troops murdered an American missionary, William A. Reimert. This provoked the intervention of the American gunboat Upshur, which sent ashore a landing party of one officer and 40 men on June 25 to protect the American mission. Two days later—when local tensions had eased—they were re-embarked. On the 29th Jingyao was removed from office; the Chinese foreign office investigated the incident and expressed its profound regrets to the Americans. Zhang was later pardoned, in obscure circumstances.

In 1933 Zhang became involved in the scheme of the Empire of Japan to set up the monarchy of Puyi in northern China with Japanese money. An assassin shot and fatally wounded him in Peiping's Grand Hotel.

Awards and decorations

Order of Rank and MeritOrder of Wen-Hu

See also
 Warlord Era

Sources 
 
 Rulers: Chinese administrative divisions
 USS Upshur

Republic of China warlords from Anhui
Politicians from Lu'an
1881 births
1933 deaths
Assassinated Chinese politicians
Governors of Hunan
Chinese collaborators with Imperial Japan
Political office-holders in Hebei
Members of the Anhui clique